Jan-Erik Danielsson (born 10 February 1960) is a Swedish modern pentathlete. He competed at the 1988 Summer Olympics.

References

External links
 

1960 births
Living people
Swedish male modern pentathletes
Olympic modern pentathletes of Sweden
Modern pentathletes at the 1988 Summer Olympics
People from Söderhamn
Sportspeople from Gävleborg County